Alois Kanamüller (born 14 August 1952) is a German biathlete. He competed at the 1976 Winter Olympics and the 1980 Winter Olympics.

References

External links
 

1952 births
Living people
German male biathletes
Olympic biathletes of West Germany
Biathletes at the 1976 Winter Olympics
Biathletes at the 1980 Winter Olympics
People from Freyung-Grafenau
Sportspeople from Lower Bavaria
20th-century German people